Kidsgrove Liverpool Road railway station was the northernmost station on the Potteries Loop Line and served the town of Kidsgrove, Staffordshire. It was opened as Kidsgrove in 1875, but renamed in 1944 when the nearby Harecastle station became Kidsgrove railway station.

The site of the station is now occupied by a Tesco supermarket.

References

Disused railway stations in Staffordshire
Railway stations in Great Britain closed in 1964
Railway stations in Great Britain opened in 1875
Former North Staffordshire Railway stations
Beeching closures in England
Kidsgrove